Yoel Judah (born July 23, 1956) is the eldest member of the Brooklyn-based Judah boxing family.  He has been a martial artist, three-time world champion kickboxer, and boxing trainer and manager.

Boxing and kickboxing career 

Johnny Saxton, who twice won the world welterweight championship, was Judah's uncle.  Judah had a brief boxing career in the 1980s, going 1–1 in two fights. He is also a 9th-degree black belt and former three-time world kickboxing champion, trained at one point by Billy Slinker.

Training and managing career
He has been the trainer and manager of his sons Zab Judah, Daniel Judah, and Josiah Judah. He has also trained heavyweight Shannon Briggs.

Melee, license revocation, fine, and aftermath 

He received national attention for his involvement in the melee in round 10 of the Floyd Mayweather Jr. vs. Zab Judah fight on April 8, 2006.  After Zab hit Mayweather below the belt and with a rabbit punch, Roger Mayweather (Mayweather Jr.'s trainer) stormed the ring and went after Zab. Referee Richard Steele had Roger restrained until Yoel entered the ring and threw a right hand at Roger—an act that caused the ring to fill with Mayweather's camp members, security officers, and Las Vegas police.  On May 8, 2006, the Nevada State Athletic Commission fined Yoel $100,000 and revoked his training license for one year.

When Zab Judah was involved in a later controversy, this time the recipient of what his angry cornerman Tommy Smalls believed were flagrant low blows by WBA welterweight champion Miguel Cotto in their June 9, 2007, fight before a sold-out crowd at Madison Square Garden, the father this time played a calming role, telling Smalls "What's done is done."

Religion

The Judahs are Black Hebrews, and often attend Jewish Sabbath services.  Judah is an avowed Hebrew Israelite, and Judah's family has declared themselves Jewish.

See also 
 List of male kickboxers
 Notable boxing families

References

External links 
 Yoel Judah interview at BraggingRightsCorner.com
 

Boxers from New York (state)
American boxing managers
American boxing trainers
American male kickboxers
Kickboxers from New York (state)
Welterweight kickboxers
Black Hebrew Israelite people
Lightweight boxers
Living people
Judah family
1956 births
American male boxers